As Cruel as School Children is the third studio album by American rap rock band Gym Class Heroes, released by Fueled by Ramen/Atlantic Records on July 25, 2006. It was produced by Fall Out Boy's Patrick Stump. 

A second version of the album, released on November 4, 2006 additionally contains the single "Cupid's Chokehold" (a different recording of the song was featured on their previous album The Papercut Chronicles). Both versions of these albums have the Parental Advisory sticker on them.  As Cruel as School Children shows a significant departure from the style of their previous work such as the use of drum machine, acoustic guitar, synthesizers and the band dabbling in many genres such as electronica, funk and soul. 

The album received generally favorable reviews, and it has since been certified gold by the RIAA. The title of the album is a lyric from "Scandalous Scholastics", one of the album's tracks. The band later re-released this album, with the inclusion of a new remix of "Cupid's Chokehold".

Appearances and influences
A number of notable musicians appear on this album. "Clothes Off!" features Fall Out Boy vocalist Patrick Stump, who was also the album's producer. The hook for the song is from Jermaine Stewart's 1986 song "We Don't Have to Take Our Clothes Off". "Biters Block" features Speech of Arrested Development. The chorus for "Cupid's Chokehold" comes from the single "Breakfast in America" by Supertramp and is sung by Patrick Stump from Fall Out Boy.

A number of tracks have been used in other media. Track 3, "New Friend Request" and track 8, "It's OK, but Just this Once!"  were used in the film Snakes On A Plane. Travis McCoy also guest stars on the films theme tune, "Bring It (Snakes on a Plane)", whilst the song "It's OK, But Just This Once" was briefly featured on HBO's hit series Entourage in episode 319 - "The Prince's Bride". The chorus of "Shoot Down The Stars" is briefly heard in Never Back Down.

Release and reception

As Cruel as School Children debuted at number 35 on the US Billboard 200 chart, becoming the group's first album to reach the chart. On August 9, 2007, the album was certified gold by the Recording Industry Association of America (RIAA) for sales of over 500,000 copies in the United States.

Since its release, As Cruel as School Children has received generally positive reviews. Alternative Press called the album "nothing short of a classic", also heavily praising the use of live instrumentation. In a less enthusiastic review, Victoria Durham of Drowned in Sound stated that the band needed to "get rid of the filler" in order to be more successful. Though, she also noted the group's potential, referring to their creative rhyming as what could set them up to be "the OutKast of the rock world".

Track listing

Standard Edition
All songs written by Gym Class Heroes, Sam Hollander and Dave Katz, except Clothes Off, written by Gym Class Heroes, Sam Hollander, Dave Katz, Preston Glass and Narada Walden and Cupid's Chokehold/Breakfast In America, written by Travis McCoy, Roger Hodgson and Rick Davies.
1st Period: "The Queen and I" – 3:15
2nd Period: "Shoot Down the Stars" – 3:38
3rd Period: "New Friend Request" – 4:14
4th Period: "Clothes Off!!" (featuring Patrick Stump)  – 3:55
Lunch: "Sloppy Love Jingle, Pt. 1" – 1:52
6th Period: "Viva la White Girl" – 3:53
7th Period: "7 Weeks" (featuring William Beckett) – 3:51
8th Period: "It's Ok, but Just This Once!" – 3:10
Study Hall: "Sloppy Love Jingle, Pt. 2" – 1:01
10th Period: "Biters Block" – 3:48
Yearbook Club: "Boys in Bands" (interlude) – 0:59
12th Period: "Scandalous Scholastics" – 4:17
13th Period: "On My Own Time (Write On!)" – 4:42
Intramurals: "Cupid's Chokehold/Breakfast In America" (featuring Patrick Stump) – 3:58
Detention: "Sloppy Love Jingle, Pt. 3" – 2:15

Limited Edition Bonus Disc
"Clothes Off!!" (Stress remix) (featuring Ghostface Killah, Tyga and Patrick Stump) – 4:32
"Viva la White Girl" (remix) (featuring Lil Wayne) – 4:46
"The Machine and I" (featuring Keith Buckley) – 4:22
"New Friend Request" (SK1 Ferrer remix) (featuring Papoose) – 4:15

Personnel
Travis McCoy (Schleprok) – vocals
Disashi Lumumba-Kasongo – guitar
Matt McGinley – drums
Eric Roberts – bass guitar

Charts

Weekly charts

Year-end charts

Certifications

Release history

References

Gym Class Heroes albums
2006 albums
Fueled by Ramen albums
Atlantic Records albums
Albums recorded at Watchmen Recording Studios